Máximo Carlos Kirchner (born 16 February 1977) is an Argentine politician who has served as a National Deputy since 2015. He is the son of two former presidents of Argentina, Néstor Kirchner and Cristina Fernández de Kirchner, the latter of which is currently service as the vice president of Argentina. A member of the Justicialist Party, he is the co-founder of La Cámpora, a political youth organisation which supported the presidencies of his parents.

Since 2019, he has served as president of the Frente de Todos parliamentary bloc in the Chamber of Deputies. In 2021, he was elected president of the Buenos Aires Province Justicialist Party.

Early life
Máximo Kirchner was born in La Plata. He attended the República de Guatemala high school in Río Gallegos, Santa Cruz Province, where his father worked as governor. Later, in Buenos Aires, he studied law and journalism but did not finish either course.

Political career
In 2006, alongside other emerging political leaders such as Andrés Larroque, Eduardo de Pedro, Juan Cabandié and Mariano Recalde, Kirchner founded La Cámpora, a youth political organisation formed to group young supporters of his father's government. The organisation's leadership eventually passed to Larroque, who has since December 2006 acted as its secretary general.

Congressman
In the 2015 legislative election, Kirchner ran for a seat in the National Chamber of Deputies as the first candidate in the Front for Victory (FPV) list in Santa Cruz Province. Although the FPV came second in the election, with 46.30% of the vote Kirchner received enough votes to be elected. During his 2015–2019 term, he was appointed as the opposition's representative in the Bicameral Commission for the control of the decrees of necessity and urgency. He was also appointed to the parliamentary commissions on Energy and Fuels, Mining, Impeachments, and Freedom of Expression. During his first three years in office, he introduced 23 bills to the chamber and co-signed two resolutions. Likewise, in that period, he voted affirmatively 186 times, negatively 115 times, abstained 9 times and had 141 absences.

In the 2019 legislative election, Kirchner ran for re-election in Buenos Aires Province instead of Santa Cruz. He was the fifth candidate in the party list of the newly formed Frente de Todos, which received 52.64% of the vote – enough for Kirchner to be elected. Upon taking office, he became president of the unified Frente de Todos parliamentary bloc. On February 1, 2022, Kirchner resigned as President of the Frente de Todos bloc over a disagreement with President Alberto Fernandez over his government's deal with the International Monetary Fund.

In December 2021, he was elected president of the Buenos Aires Province Justicialist Party.

Personal life
Kirchner was formerly in a relationship with Rocío García, a dentist, with whom he had two children: Néstor Iván, born in 2013 in Buenos Aires, and Emilia, born in 2016 in Río Gallegos. Kirchner and García separated in 2018 after nearly 10 years together. Kirchner is of German, Swiss-German, Spanish and Croatian descent.

Electoral history

References

External links

1977 births
Living people
Justicialist Party politicians
Members of La Cámpora
Maximo
Children of presidents of Argentina
Argentine people of Chilean descent
Argentine people of Swiss-German descent
Argentine people of Croatian descent
Argentine people of Asturian descent
Argentine people of German descent
Argentine people of Spanish descent
People from La Plata
Members of the Argentine Chamber of Deputies elected in Buenos Aires Province
Members of the Argentine Chamber of Deputies elected in Santa Cruz